Stanley I. Gold (born August 8, 1947, in Fair Lawn, New Jersey) is a former Arthur Young & Co. Accountant who left the professional services industry and became a Champion trainer of Thoroughbred racehorses. In 2010 he won the Breeders' Cup Juvenile Fillies with Awesome Feather who would be voted that year's Eclipse Award for American Champion Two-Year-Old Filly.

References

1947 births
living people
Fairleigh Dickinson University alumni
Ernst & Young people
American horse trainers
People from Fair Lawn, New Jersey